Isabelle Huppert is a French actress who has appeared in more than 120 feature films, mostly in starring roles. Regarded as one of the most respected actresses in French cinema, she has appeared in films directed by Claude Chabrol, Jean-Luc Godard and Michael Haneke. She has also starred in numerous stage productions, in Paris and around the world.

Her first big break came in Bertrand Blier's Les Valseuses (1974), which was a success in France. Huppert's first English-language film was Rosebud (1975), directed by Otto Preminger and starring Peter O'Toole.

As of 2022, she has appeared in 22 films that have been screened In Competition at the Cannes Film Festival. At Cannes she has won the Best Actress Award twice, for her roles in Violette Nozière (1978) and The Piano Teacher (2001). She has also won a BAFTA Award for Most Promising Newcomer for The Lacemaker (1977), and two Volpi Cups at Venice for Story of Women (1988) and La Cérémonie (1995). She has been nominated for 16 César Awards, twice winning the Best Actress award, for La Cérémonie and for Elle. Huppert won the Golden Globe Award and received a nomination for the Academy Award for Best Actress for her work in Paul Verhoeven's Elle (2016).

Also a prolific stage actress, Huppert is the most nominated actress for the Molière Award, with eight nominations; she received an honorary lifetime achievement award in 2017. In 2017 she was also awarded the Europe Theatre Prize. 

In 2022 she received the Honorary Golden Bear from the Berlin Film Festival.

Films

Television

Stage

Public readings

Discography

Albums
 2001: Madame Deshoulières with Jean-Louis Murat

Tracks
 1976: "La Commune Est En Lutte" for the soundtrack of The Judge and the Assassin
 1976: "Promenade" for the soundtrack of The Judge and the Assassin
 1981: "Dans La Chambre Vide (Romance)" for the soundtrack of Coup de Torchon
 1985: "Signé Charlotte! (Souvenir Chiffonné)" for the soundtrack of Sincerely Charlotte
 2002: "Message personnel" for the soundtrack of 8 Women
 2004: "Rue De Jollières" for the soundtrack of Les Sœurs fâchées
 2016: "Joli Garçon" for the soundtrack of Souvenir
 2016: "Souvenir" for the soundtrack of Souvenir

Audiobooks
 1988: Le Roseau révolté by Nina Berberova
 1994: The Flood (L’Inondation) by Yevgeny Zamyatin
 1994: Music and Poetry (Musique et Poésie) by Ingeborg Bachmann in Voices of Women for Democracy (Voix de femmes pour la démocratie)
 2009: Tropisms (Tropismes) by Nathalie Sarraute

See also
 List of awards and nominations received by Isabelle Huppert

Notes

References

External links
 
 

Actress filmographies
French filmographies